The 1955 Chicago Cubs season was the 84th season of the Chicago Cubs franchise, the 80th in the National League and the 40th at Wrigley Field. The Cubs finished sixth in the National League with a record of 72–81.

Offseason 
 October 1, 1954: Johnny Klippstein and Jim Willis were traded by the Cubs to the Cincinnati Redlegs for Jim Bolger, Harry Perkowski and Ted Tappe.
 November 16, 1954: Ralph Kiner was sent by the Cubs to the Cleveland Indians for $60,000 as part of an earlier deal (the Cubs sent a player to be named later to the Indians for Sam Jones and players to be named later) made on September 30, 1954. The Indians sent Gale Wade to the Cubs on November 30 to complete the trade.
 November 22, 1954: Jim King was drafted by the Cubs from the St. Louis Cardinals in the 1954 rule 5 draft.

Regular season 
 May 10, 1955: Duke Snider of the Brooklyn Dodgers hit the 200th HR of his career against the Cubs. The opposing pitcher was Warren Hacker and the home run was hit at Wrigley Field.
 May 12, 1955: Sam Jones of the Cubs became the first black pitcher to throw a no-hitter in the major leagues. It was against the Pittsburgh Pirates.

Season standings

Record vs. opponents

Notable transactions 
 April 16, 1955: Lloyd Merriman was purchased by the Cubs from the Chicago White Sox.
 June 12, 1955: Owen Friend was purchased by the Cubs from the Boston Red Sox.
 August 19, 1955: George Altman was signed as an amateur free agent by the Cubs.
 August 19, 1955: J. C. Hartman was signed as an amateur free agent by the Cubs.

Roster

Player stats

Batting

Starters by position 
Note: Pos = Position; G = Games played; AB = At bats; H = Hits; Avg. = Batting average; HR = Home runs; RBI = Runs batted in

Other batters 
Note: G = Games played; AB = At bats; H = Hits; Avg. = Batting average; HR = Home runs; RBI = Runs batted in

Pitching

Starting pitchers 
Note: G = Games pitched; IP = Innings pitched; W = Wins; L = Losses; ERA = Earned run average; SO = Strikeouts

Other pitchers 
Note: G = Games pitched; IP = Innings pitched; W = Wins; L = Losses; ERA = Earned run average; SO = Strikeouts

Relief pitchers 
Note: G = Games pitched; W = Wins; L = Losses; SV = Saves; ERA = Earned run average; SO = Strikeouts

Farm system 

LEAGUE CHAMPIONS: Lafayette, Magic Valley

Gainesville franchise transferred to Ponca City and renamed, May 19, 1955

Notes

References 

1955 Chicago Cubs season at Baseball Reference

Chicago Cubs seasons
Chicago Cubs season
Chicago Cubs